Dongjing may refer to:

Eastern Capital (東京)
 Luoyang, eastern capital of Sui and Tang dynasties
 Kaifeng, eastern and main capital of the Northern Song dynasty
 Shangjing Longquanfu, or Dongjing
 Tonkin, Vietnam
 Tokyo, Japan

Other uses
 Dongjing, Changsha, a subdistrict of Yuhua District, Changsha, Hunan province
 Dongjing, Shanghai, a town of Songjiang District, Shanghai
 Dongjing Station, on Shanghai Metro Line 9
 Dongjing (music), Chinese ritual music

See also
 Dongjin (disambiguation)